Slava may refer to:

Ships
 Slava class cruiser, a modern Russian warship
 Soviet cruiser Slava (1979), now Russian cruiser Moskva, a Slava class guided missile cruiser sunk during the 2022 Russian invasion of Ukraine
 Russian battleship Slava, a Russian World War I warship
 Soviet cruiser Slava (1939), previously known as Molotov, renamed Slava in 1957
 Slava (submarine), a Soviet-manufactured Bulgarian Romeo-class submarine
 Slava, a number of German-built ships seized by the UK during World War II and transferred to the Soviet Union, cf. List of Empire ships (U–Z)
 Slava II, a German-built whaler in Russian service

Traditions
 Slava (tradition), a custom of celebrating a family patron saint found mainly among the Serbs

People
 Slava (given name), a Slavic masculine and feminine name
 Slava (singer), stage name of Russian singer Anastasia Slanevskaya

Arts and entertainment 
 Slava! A Political Overture, a 1977 composition by Leonard Bernstein
 Slava Music, a sub-label of Blonde Vinyl
 Slava (film), the Bulgarian title of Glory, a 2016 drama

Places
 Slava (crater), a lunar crater
 Slava (river), a river in Tulcea County, Romania
 Slava, Altai Krai, a rural locality in Altai Krai, Russia
 Slava, Amur Oblast, Russia
 Slava Ice Shelf, Antarctica

Other
 Slava Moscow, a Moscow-based Russian rugby union club
 Slava watches, a Russian brand produced by the Second Moscow Watch Factory

See also
 
 Slava Ukraini
 Sława, a town in Poland